Earle Sumner Draper (1893–1994) was an American town planner and a landscape designer, who is famous for having coined the term "urban sprawl".

A number of his works are listed on the National Register of Historic Places.

Projects
His works include:

Silvertown Historic Mill Village, Thomaston, GA
Alexander Manufacturing Company Mill Village Historic District, roughly bounded by Victory & Wilson Drs., Allen & S. Broadway Sts. Forest City, NC (Draper, Earle Sumner), NRHP-listed
Cliffside Public School, 1 N. Main St. Cliffside, NC (Draper, Earle Sumner), NRHP-listed
Druid Hills Historic District, roughly bounded by Meadowbrook Terrace, US 25N, Ashwood Rd., and Ridgewood Ave. Hendersonville, NC (Draper, Earle Sumner), NRHP-listed
Erlanger Mill Village Historic District, roughly bounded by Winston Rd., Short, 7th, Hames, Second Rainbow, Park Circle, & Olympia Sts. Lexington, NC (Draper, Earle Sumner), NRHP-listed
Hayes Barton Historic District, roughly bounded by St. Mary's St., Glenwood Ave. and Williamson Dr. Raleigh, NC (Draper, Earle S.), NRHP-listed
Laurelwood Cemetery, bordered by Laurel, W. White, Stewart, and W. Main Sts. Rock Hill, SC (Draper, Earle S.), NRHP-listed
Lexington Residential Historic District, roughly bounded by State St., W. Fifth St., Martin St., Westside Dr., Southbound St., and W. Ninth Ave. Lexington, NC (Draper, Earle Sumner), NRHP-listed
McAdenville Historic District, 100-413 Main St., Elm and Poplar Sts., and cross sts. from I-85 to S. Fork of Catawba River McAdenville, NC (Draper, Earle Sumner), NRHP-listed
Pacolet Mill Office, 180 Montgomery Ave., Pacolet, SC (Draper, Earle S.), NRHP-listed
Rutherfordton-Spindale Central High School, Rutherfordton, North Carolina, NRHP-listed
Chicopee Mill and Village, Atlanta Hwy, Gainesville, GA (Draper, Earle S.), NRHP-listed

He also did work in 
MidTown (Columbus, Georgia)
Sequoyah Hills, Tennessee
Lake Lure, North Carolina - the 1926 Draper Plan for what is today the Lake Lure Town Center

References

20th-century American architects
American landscape architects
1893 births
1994 deaths